The Rowallan Power Station is a conventional hydroelectric power station located in north-western Tasmania, Australia.

Technical details
Part of the MerseyForth scheme that comprises eight hydroelectric power stations, the Devils Gate Power Station is the first station in the scheme. The dam is one of the two main headwater storages in the Mersey Forth scheme and assists in regulating the water supply to four downstream power stations.

The station output, estimated to be  annually, is fed to TasNetworks' transmission grid via a 22 kV/110 kV transmission line to the switchyard transformer.

Rowallan Lake
The reservoir is managed by the Tasmanian Inland Fisheries Service as a trout fishery; both Brown trout and Rainbow trout are stocked; there are also native Climbing galaxias, Spotted galaxias and River blackfish. Lake Rowallan is also the starting point for walks into nearby highland areas including the Walls of Jerusalem National Park. In 2010, concerns were raised about the integrity of the embankment dam.

Etymology
Both the power station and lake are named in honour of Thomas Corbett, 2nd Baron Rowallan, the former Governor of Tasmania.

See also

 List of power stations in Tasmania

References

External links
Hydro Tasmania page on the Mersey Forth catchment

Hydroelectric power stations in Tasmania
Energy infrastructure completed in 1968
Localities of Meander Valley Council
Mersey River (Tasmania)